The 2020 Credit One Bank Invitational was a women's tennis event on the 2020 WTA Tour. Originally scheduled as the Volvo Cars Open between April 6 – 12, 2020, the COVID-19 pandemic forced a postponement and a change to the event by Charleston Tennis, which owns the event.

History
On May 22, 2020, Ben Navarro, the organiser of the Charleston Open, announced the reformatted event. Credit One Bank sponsored the event, billed as the return of top-level women's tennis to competitive play in the United States. This improvised edition of the tournament was reformatted as a 16-player women's tennis all-star tournament using Laver Cup rules. The event was held behind closed doors, with prize money and the benefactor being the Medical University of South Carolina. It was held at the Family Circle Tennis Center, on Daniel Island, Charleston, United States, as a clay court tournament held on green clay. It took place from June 23 until June 28, 2020.

Madison Keys and Bethanie Mattek-Sands were captains of the 16-player event featuring Sofia Kenin, Sloane Stephens, Victoria Azarenka, Amanda Anisimova, Monica Puig, Ajla Tomljanović, Danielle Collins, Alison Riske, Shelby Rogers, Genie Bouchard, Jennifer Brady, Leylah Fernandez, Emma Navarro and Caroline Dolehide. There were 24 matches in total with 16 singles and eight doubles matches.

The tournament counted towards Universal Tennis Rating points. Each match was worth points depending on the day of the event, with only singles matches on the first day and only doubles matches on the final day. A team needed 25 of a possible 48 points to win the event.

All matches were two-set matches. If the match was tied after two sets, a ten-point tiebreaker was played.

The team led by Bethanie Mattek-Sands, Team Peace, won the event, 26–22.  Jennifer Brady had the best performance of the tournament, going 4–0 in her four matches, the only undefeated player.

Teams 

Captains listed in bold.

Source:

Schedule 

NOTE:  The first two matches on Wednesday were "Day One" matches.  For purposes of this tournament, Days One and Two are one-point matches, Days Three and Four are two-point matches, and Days Five and Six are three-point matches.

References

External links 
 

2020 WTA Tour
2020 in American tennis
2020 Volvo Car Open
June 2020 sports events in the United States
Tennis events postponed due to the COVID-19 pandemic